New St. John's Cemetery is a cemetery in Tartu, Estonia. Next to this cemetery is located Old St. John's Cemetery.

Cemetery was opened in April 1890.

Burials
 August Rauber
 Edmund August Friedrich Russow
 Carl Ernst Heinrich Schmidt
 Hugo Treffner
 Mihkel Veske

References

External links
 About the cemetery, tartu.ee (in Estonian)

Cemeteries in Estonia
Tartu
1890 establishments in the Russian Empire